Tavin Marin (born 1971) is a film producer who has worked on projects of a diverse budget range from blockbusters The Day After Tomorrow, Independence Day and Godzilla to producing Sci Fi Channel Original Movies including: "Odysseus: Isle of the Mist", "Riddle of the Sphinx", "Sherlock Holmes and the Banshee", Alien Lockdown, The Man with No Eyes, and Emmy nominated Mammoth.

In addition she executive produced two Sundance Film Festival selections including On line and 2006 indie (independent film)award winning documentary film Who Killed the Electric Car?.  In 2012, Tavin produced the transmedia experience, which received 12 nominations for IAWTV awards, including winner for Best Webseries, Drama.

In 2013 Tavin joined Apple's World Wide Marketing group to spearhead a range of projects from advertising campaigns to product launch films featured in Apple's widely viewed Keynote events.  Tavin accepted a new role at Apple in 2017 under Apple Media Products (AMP) Design group to lead a video team focused on design and storytelling.

Tavin resides in San Francisco, California with her two children and partner.

References

External links
 

1971 births
Living people
American film producers